Einer Bankz is an American ukulele player and platinum producer from the San Francisco Bay Area. He is known for his viral videos with rappers where he plays the ukulele as the artists rap a cappella. He has created acoustic content with artists such as Chance the Rapper, Lil Wayne, YG, Roddy Ricch, Jhene Aiko, Kodak Black, Ski Mask the Slump God, Blueface, Trippie Redd, Swae Lee, Machine Gun Kelly, Polo G, YNW Melly, The Kid LAROI, Lil Durk, CJ and others.

Career 
Einer started his career after Snoop Dogg reposted one of his videos, causing his first ukulele cover version to go viral.

His production credits include tracks for artists such as 21 Savage, Quando Rondo, Travis Scott and Dave East. He also produced Louisiana artist Fredo Bang's hit single "Oouuh".

In early 2018, Mass Appeal released a short documentary about Einer and where he plans to take his movement. The short also featured Lil Durk. Shortly thereafter, Bankz produced a song for Durk's album Love Songs 4 the Streets 2. For several years in his early career Bankz was managed by tech entrepreneur Anthony Rodio.

In August 2018, the New York Times featured his video with Florida rapper Project Youngin in their weekly playlist writeup.

In 2019, Bankz was nominated for a Grammy for his production on 21 Savage's album I Am > I Was.

Einer maintains a global presence, and has worked with artists from the United Kingdom, Italy, India, Canada, Puerto Rico, and Nigeria.

He was featured in the music video for Polo G's chart-topping "RAPSTAR" (which he co-produced alongside Synco).

Production Credits
2021
 "Rapstar" (Polo G) 
 "No Where" (YoungBoy Never Broke Again) 

2022
 "Save The Day" (NoCap featuring Kodak Black) 
 "No Love"  (Fredo Bang featuring Sleepy Hallow)

References 

Year of birth missing (living people)
Living people
American ukulele players
Musicians from San Francisco
American hip hop record producers